Manuel Muñiz Rodriguez (born December 31, 1947) is a Puerto Rican former professional baseball pitcher, who played in Major League Baseball (MLB) for the Philadelphia Phillies in part of the  season.

References

External links

Manny Muñiz at Baseball Almanac

Major League Baseball pitchers
Philadelphia Phillies players
Miami Marlins (FSL) players
Spartanburg Phillies players
Bakersfield Bears players
Macon Peaches players
Tidewater Tides players
Reading Phillies players
Raleigh-Durham Phillies players
Eugene Emeralds players
Major League Baseball players from Puerto Rico
People from Caguas, Puerto Rico
1947 births
Living people